Il delitto è servito (Literally The crime is served) is an Italian television program of the detective game show genre, and an Italian adaption of the British game show Cluedo, and an elaboration of the British board game of the same name that transforms participants into detectives. It was broadcast in the late evening on Canale 5 and Rete 4 over 15 episodes from December 1992 to January 1993, and May 1993 to July 1993. The series was hosted by Maurizio Micheli. It was produced by La Italiana Produzioni.

The broadcast was a detective game show inspired by the Cluedo board game, which aired on Friday in the late evening and later on Saturdays. The aim of the game was to discover for each episode the culprit of a crime among six suspects, through questions and clips from a short drama played by them, until the revelation of the murderer. In each episode, four competitors in the studio and one telephone from home faced each other in solving the mysterious case.

Production 
The Italian version of Cluedo was called Il delitto è servito (The crime is served) and ran from 1992 to 1993 on Canale 5 and Rete 4. It was hosted by Maurizio Micheli, who also conceived of the Italian adaption. directed by Paolo Zenatello, produced by Nanni Mandelli, cinematographer Andriano Bernacchi. The show was Micheli's debut as a presenter. Each episode saw a crime committed at the six-room Villa dei Castagni. It was by Italiana Produzioni and Mediaset networks. Prior to directing the show,  Zenatello had director other television game shows for Fininvest including Caccia al tesoro (Treasure Hunt).  Maurizio Micheli commented, "strange to say, it's a smart quiz."

The show was first broadcast on Friday evenings, and later on Saturdays. It was cancelled in February 1993 due to poor ratings.

Plot and gameplay 
The program is led by Maurizio Micheli, who has the task of investigating the intricate murders. In each episode there are two pairs of detectives made up of actors, writers, mystery writers or experts in the sector. The murder always takes place in the same villa, there are six possible weapons used for the crime, and always the same six potential killers - a fixed cast of three actors and three actresses. The game is won by the couple who manages to solve the case by answering the three key questions - who? where? with what?. Viewers can also play by questioning the suspects on the phone.

There were four competitors in the studio and one by telephone from home.  Each episode lasted half an hour.

The six suspects are:

 Aldo Rall as Don Verdone (Reverend Green)
 Serena Cantalupi as Lacontessa Maria Azzurra Biolchi Padini (Mrs. Peacock)
 Grazia Minarelli as Rossella Biolchi Padini (Miss Scarlet) 
 Maurizio Trombini as Dott. Piergiorgio Bruni (Professor Plum)
 Giuliana Rivera as Bianca Pelloni (Mrs White)
 Gabriele Villa as Comm. Arturo Biondi (Colonel Mustard)

Episodes (incomplete)

Critical reception 
Micheli said the show was "well packaged by prominent authors and with important actors" but added "it was canceled because it did not have many viewers...only  people with good taste liked it." Italian newspaper La Repubblica wrote that "the whole program is quite pleasant." Meanwhile, Teatroemusicanews wrote Il delitto è servito was a "beautiful program". Orgoglionerd thought it is program where "deduction, intelligence and attention to detail were the masters". Radiocorriere thought the show offered a "very complicated story". La Stampa deemed it "an agile and fast program that you can watch without dying of boredom"; furthermore it noted the show was "simply a good product with an extra idea, which is now very rare", and concluding it as a "refreshing little program, a nice little surprise".

References 

Italian television series based on British television series